Twin Sitters (also called The Babysitters) is a 1994 American comedy film directed and written by John Paragon and starring Peter Paul, David Paul and Christian and Joseph Cousins. The plot concerns identical twin brother bodybuilders who protect 10 year old identical twin brother pranksters left by a corrupt uncle in their care.

Plot 
Peter and David Falcone are identical twin brother waiters who want nothing more than to open their own restaurant, but are unable to get a loan. Frank Hillhurst is a corrupt businessman who has decided to give state's evidence, but his former right-hand man has threatened to kill Hillhurst and his nephews if he testifies. After the Falcone twins save Hillhurst's life, he hires them to protect his young nephews, paying them more than they have ever made in their life. Hillhurst soon departs with Federal agents, leaving Peter and David with a pair of massively mischievous identical twin ten-year-old brothers with a double mean streak.

Cast 
Peter Paul as Peter Falcone
David Paul as David Falcone
Christian Cousins as Bradley
Joseph Cousins as Steven
Rena Sofer as Judy Newman
Jared Martin as Frank Hillhurst
Barry Dennen as Thomas
Mother Love as Penny
George Lazenby as Leland Stromm
Valentina Vargas as Lolita
Vic Trevino as Ramon
David Wells as Bennett
Danny Lee Clark as Sniper / Cop (as Dan Clark)
Paul Bartel as Linguini-covered man
Suzanne Kent as Linguini-covered woman
Jacque Lynn Colton as Ma Falcone
Don Amendolia as Pa Falcone
Rhonda Rydell as Reporter
John Paragon as Loan Officer
Lynne Marie Stewart as Homeless Woman
Del Rubio Triplets as Waitresses (uncredited)

Soundtrack 
 "At War with the Weights" by Paul Sabu
 "Shut Up" by Peter Paul & David Paul
 "Watcha Lookin' At" by Peter Paul & David Paul
 "The Babysitters" by Paul Sabu
 "I Ride My Harley" by Peter Paul & David Paul
 "Brothers Forever" by Paul Sabu

References

External links 

Twin Sitters Trailer

 

1994 films
1994 comedy-drama films
American children's comedy films
1990s English-language films
1990s American films